Lucile Henriette Mondutaigny (12 February 1826 – 24 February 1901) was a French singer.

Life 
Born in Lyon, she attained first prize in singing and second prize in opera at the Conservatoire de Paris in 1844. She married Jules Brésil 20 June 1848. A mezzo-soprano, she achieved recognition  in the role of Alice in Meyerbeer's Robert le Diable (1844)  then in the première of César Franck's oratorio Ruth, presented  on 1 November 1845 in the Salle Érard and performed until she was over 80 years old.

She was also a teacher of voice and piano.

She died in Paris in 1901.

Bibliography 
 Félix Clément, Pierre Larousse, Arthur Pougin, Dictionnaire des opéras, 1969, vol.2,

References 

1826 births
1901 deaths
Musicians from Lyon
Conservatoire de Paris alumni
French operatic mezzo-sopranos
19th-century French women singers
French music educators
Women music educators